That's Adequate is a 1990 mockumentary documenting a fictional Hollywood studio, Adequate Film Studios. Narrated and hosted by Tony Randall, the film features an all-star cast including James Coco (in his final film role), Robert Downey Jr., Anne Meara, Jerry Stiller, Bruce Willis and Ben Stiller.

It was also the last movie for actress Ina Balin, who had appeared in Hurwitz's previous films such as  The Projectionist and The Comeback Trail.

Premise

That's Adequate is a documentary about a fictional Hollywood film studio.

Cast

References

External links 

1989 films
1989 independent films
American parody films
American independent films
American mockumentary films
1980s parody films
Films directed by Harry Hurwitz
1989 comedy films
1980s English-language films
1980s American films